Manuel Samaniego Barriga (born 10 October 1930 in Angamacatiro) was a Mexican clergyman and auxiliary bishop for the Roman Catholic Diocese of Saltillo, and later for Ciudad Altamirano and Cuautitlán. He became ordained in 1953. He was appointed bishop in 1969. He died in 2005.

References

20th-century Roman Catholic bishops in Mexico
1930 births
2005 deaths